Molenhoek is a village located in south-eastern Netherlands partially in the municipality of Mook en Middelaar in the province of Limburg and partially in the municipality of Heumen in the province of Gelderland. It is also the northernmost town of Limburg and thus its nickname is "De Poort van Limburg" (The Gate of Limburg).

Molenhoek lies on the Maas river (which originates in France as the Meuse (river)); the Maas-Waal Canal connects the Maas at Molenhoek to the Waal near Nijmegen.

In the Gelderland part of the village the former Bergzigt (later De Raaf) brewery is located.

Gallery

References 

Heumen
Mook en Middelaar
Populated places in Limburg (Netherlands)